Trifurcula ortneri is a moth of the family Nepticulidae. It is widespread in the western Mediterranean region, where it is known from the Algarve in Portugal, Spain, France and Italy (Emilia-Romagna, Veneto). It has also been recorded from Croatia (Dalmatia), Morocco and Algeria, eastern Austria, Hungary, Slovakia and Germany (Baden-Württemberg and Thüringen).

The larvae feed on Coronilla coronata, Coronilla emerus, Coronilla minima, Coronilla vaginalis, Coronilla valentina, Coronilla valentine glauca and Coronilla viminalis. They mine the leaves of their host plant. The mine consists of a long, narrow, little contorted corridor, that follows the leaf margin at some distance. After a moult the corridor gradually widens considerably, generally into a wide corridor, more rarely into a real blotch. The frass in the initial corridor is deposited in a narrow, interrupted, central line. In the wider part, it is deposited in a thick lump with little, narrow interruptions. Pupation takes place outside of the mine.

External links
bladmineerders.nl
Review Of The Subgenus Trifurcula (Levarchama), With Two New Species (Lepidoptera: Nepticulidae)

Nepticulidae
Moths of Europe
Moths described in 1951